Globetrotter 2 is an educational game about geography by Deadline Games. The player has to answer geographical questions in order to progress through the game and move to other countries and cities. Each city has its own set of questions. Computer Active describes it as an "excellent learning tool for those planning a foreign trip or just hoping to pick up some general knowledge about the world around them."

References

2001 video games
Deadline Games games
Geography educational video games
Mindscape games
Video games developed in Denmark
Video games featuring protagonists of selectable gender
Windows games
Windows-only games